Jellore is a traditional Sumatran sailing craft. These boats are long and narrow, and fitted with double outriggers that stands out considerable distance from the sides. Sometimes they only have one outrigger, which is alternately set in windward and leeward. These boats are rigged with tanja rig. When the sail is partly furled, the ends of the two booms curve downwardly and inserted into the floats of the outrigger.

See also 

 Paduwang
 Knabat bogolu
 Sampan panjang
 Jongkong

References

Further reading 

 Folkard, H. C (1901). The Sailing Boat 5th Edition. London: Edward Stanford.
 Haddon, Alfred Cort (1920). The Outriggers of Indonesian Canoes. London: Royal Anthropological Institute of Great Britain and Ireland.

Indonesian inventions
Multihulls
Sailboat types
Austronesian ships
Boats of Indonesia